National Highway 57 (NH 57), previously numbered as NH 224, is a primary National Highway in India connecting Balangir and Khordha in the state of Odisha.

Route
NH57 links Balangir, Sonepur, Bauda, Dashapalla, Nayagarh and Khordha in the state of Odisha.

Junctions  
 
  Terminal near Balangir.
  near Subarnapur (Sonepur)
  near Bauda (Boudh)
  near Purunakatak
  near Madhapur
  Terminal near Khordha.

See also 
 List of National Highways in India
 List of National Highways in India by state

References

External links 

 NH 57 on OpenStreetMap

National highways in India
National Highways in Odisha
Transport in Balangir